Trams in Bydgoszcz is a tram system in Bydgoszcz, Poland that has been in operation since 1888.

Types of vehicles

Normal

Historical

Lines

References

External links 

 MZK Bydgoszcz

Transport in Bydgoszcz
Tram transport in Poland
Metre gauge railways in Poland
Bydgoszcz